The Bibliotheca Alexandrina (Latin for "Library of Alexandria";) (BA) is a major library and cultural center on the shore of the Mediterranean Sea in Alexandria, Egypt. It is a commemoration of the Library of Alexandria, once one of the largest libraries worldwide, which was lost in antiquity. The idea of reviving the old library dates back to 1974 when a committee set up by Alexandria University selected a plot of land for its new library. Construction work began in 1995, and after some US$220 millions had been spent, the complex was officially inaugurated on 16 October 2002. In 2009, the library received a donation of 500,000 books from the Bibliothèque nationale de France (BnF). The gift makes the Bibliotheca Alexandrina the sixth-largest Francophone library in the world.

The library has shelf space for eight million books, with the main reading room covering 20,000 square metres (220,000 sq ft). The complex also houses a conference center; specialized libraries for maps, multimedia, the blind and visually impaired, young people, and for children; four museums; four art galleries for temporary exhibitions; 15 permanent exhibitions; a planetarium; and a manuscript restoration laboratory.

History

The idea of reviving the old library dates back to 1974 when a committee set up by Alexandria University selected a plot of land for its new library between the campus and the seafront, close to where the ancient library once stood. The recreation of the ancient library was not only adopted by other individuals and agencies, it garnered support from Egyptian politicians. One leading supporter of the project was former Egyptian President Hosni Mubarak; UNESCO was also quick to embrace the concept of endowing the Mediterranean region with a center of cultural and scientific excellence. This initiative by the Egyptian government, UNESCO, and Alexandria University was undertaken "with the aim of re-establishing Alexandria as one of the great intellectual and cultural centres of the twenty-first century". UNESCO's involvement beginning in 1986 created a great opportunity for the project to truly be international in focus.

UNESCO organized an architectural design competition in 1988 to choose a design worthy of the site and its heritage. The competition was won by Snøhetta, a Norwegian architectural office, associated with Austrian architect Christoph Kapeller and Egyptian architect Ihab El Habbak, among more than 1,400 entries. This architectural team consisted of ten members representing six countries. In addition, UNESCO created an International Commission for the Bibliotheca Alexandrina which consisted of high-level representatives from 18 diverse countries and organizations.  Given UNESCO’s involvement and the investment by the international community, this project achieved its mission to “play an educational, cultural, and scientific role throughout the region”.

The first pledges were made for funding the project at a conference held in 1990 in Aswan: USD $65 million, mostly from the MENA states. Construction work began in 1995 and, after some US$220 million had been spent, the complex was officially inaugurated on 16 October 2002.

The Bibliotheca Alexandrina is trilingual, containing books in Classical Arabic, English, and French. In 2010, the library received a donation of 500,000 books from the National Library of France, Bibliothèque nationale de France (BnF). The gift makes the Bibliotheca Alexandrina the world's sixth-largest Francophone library. The BA also is now the largest depository of French books in the Middle East and North Africa, surpassing those of Tunisia, Algeria and Morocco, in addition to being the main French library in Africa.

Building and library features
The library has shelf space for eight million books, with the main reading room covering  on eleven cascading levels. The complex also houses a conference center; specialized libraries for maps, multimedia, the blind and visually impaired, young people, and for children; four museums; four art galleries for temporary exhibitions; 15 permanent exhibitions; a planetarium; and a manuscript restoration laboratory. The library's architecture is equally striking. The main reading room stands beneath a 32-meter-high glass-panelled roof, tilted out toward the sea like a sundial, and measuring some 160 m in diameter. The walls are of gray Aswan granite, carved with characters from 120 scripts.

The collections at the Bibliotheca Alexandrina were donated from all over the world. The Spanish donated documents that detailed their period of Moorish rule. The French also donated, giving the library documents dealing with the building of the Suez Canal.

Internet Archive partnership 
The BA/IA partnership is built to preserve heritage for future generations and provide universal access to human knowledge. The BA was the site of the first mirror and external backup of the Internet Archive. The Internet Archive donated five million USD to the BA, including:
 10 billion web pages spanning the years 1996–2001 from over 16 million sites
 2000 hours of Egyptian and U.S. television broadcasts
 1000 archival films
 100 terabytes of data stored on 200 computers
 A books-scanning facility for local books

Library services

The BA's mission is to be a center of excellence in the production and dissemination of knowledge and to be a place of dialogue, learning and understanding between cultures and peoples. The Bibliotheca Alexandrina offers several additional such as book fairs, book launches, ceremonies, cinema, competitions, concerts, conferences, educational courses, exhibitions, festivals, forums, lectures, meetings, performances, presentations, reading activities, round table discussions, seminars, shows, theater, training courses, video-conferences and workshops for adults, children, young people and the academic community.
Here are some of the areas and exhibits that it comprises:

The main library
Can hold up to 8 million books.

Six specialized libraries
 The Arts and Multimedia Library
 The Taha Hussein Library for the visually impaired
 The Children's Library
 The Young People's Library
 The Microforms Library
 The Rare Books and Special Collections Library

A copy of the Internet Archive
The library provides access to print on demand books via the Espresso Book Machine.

Taha Hussein Library for the Blind and Visually Impaired
The Taha Hussein Library contains materials for the blind and visually impaired using special software that makes it possible for readers to read books and journals. It is named after Taha Hussein, the Egyptian professor of Arabic and literary critic and one of the leading figures of the Arab Renaissance (Nahda) in literature, who was himself blinded at the age of three.

Nobel Section
Contains book collections of Nobel Prize Laureates in Literature from 1901 to present. The Nobel Section was inaugurated by Queen Silvia of Sweden and Queen Sonja of Norway on 24 April 2002.

International Institutions 

 Arab Regional Office of the Academy of Science for the Developing World
 International Federation for Library Associations Regional Office
 Secretariat of the Arab National Commissions of UNESCO

Four museums

Antiquities Museum
Established in 2001, the BA Antiquities Museum is the first archeological museum to be situated within a library. The primary aims of the museum are to promote research, creativity, and cultural awareness. Holding approximately 1,316 artifacts, the Antiquities Museum collection provides a glimpse into Egyptian history from the Pharaonic era to the conquest of Alexander the Great to the Roman civilizations before the advent of Islam across Egypt. The collection includes underwater antiquities from the Mediterranean seabed near the Eastern Harbour and the Bay of Abukir.

The museum provides descriptions of artifacts in three languages: English, Arabic, and French.

Manuscript Museum
The Manuscript Museum provides visitors and researchers with rare manuscripts and books. Established in 2001, the Manuscript Museum contains the world's largest collection of digital manuscripts. It is an academic institution that is affiliated to the Library of Alexandria. The stated aims of the museum are to preserve heritage, foster human cadres in the conservation and restoration of manuscripts, and create a generation of new restorers.

The Manuscript Museum operates alongside the Manuscript Center, which provides digital access to more than 6,000 rare books, maps, and documents within the museum's collection. There are three sections housed within the museum:
 Rare Collections: This section includes the BA's unique items, such as original manuscripts, early printed books, maps, and antique coins.
 Microfilm: This section includes microfilms of around 30,000 rare manuscripts and 50,000 documents, as well as a collection from The British Library of around 14,000 Arabic, Persian, and Turkish manuscripts, which is considered the largest collection in Europe. Additionally, visitors can find a vast archive of national and Arabic newspapers.
 Museographic Display: This section is divided into the Exhibition Gallery group and the Traveling Exhibition group. The Exhibition Gallery displays the Manuscript Center's electronic publications and selected digital manuscripts.

Sadat Museum

This museum contains many personal belongings of the Egyptian president Anwar Al Sadat. The collections include some of his military robes, his Nobel Prize medal, his copy of the Qur'an, a few of his handwritten letters, pictures of him and his family, and the blood-stained military robe he wore the day of his assassination. The museum also contains a recording in his voice of part of the Qur'an and assorted newspaper articles written about him.

History of Science

Permanent exhibitions

Digital collections 
 Our Digital World: The "Our Digital World" exhibition displays some of the library's digital projects, including digital archives of former presidents, the Science Supercourse, and the Encyclopedia of Life (EOL). Additionally, digital versions of valuable books, such as Description de l'Egypte and L'Art Arabe are available.

Personal collections 
 The World of Shadi Abdel Salam: "The World of Shadi Abdel Salam" exhibition contains many of the works and effects of the Egyptian film director, screenwriter, and costume designer Shadi Abdel Salam, donated by his family to the Library to put on permanent display. This includes his library, some of his furniture, several awards, and many storyboard paintings and costumes from several of his films.
 Impressions of Alexandria: The "Impressions of Alexandria" exhibition is divided into two sections: Alexandria as seen by Artists and Travelers, and Cosmopolitan Alexandria: a Photographic Memory. The former section features travelers' and artists' original lithographs, maps, and engravings about Alexandria for the time period of the 15th century to the 19th century. The latter section features photographs from the 19th century to the mid-20th century, drawing attention to cultural works from writers and artists of the time.

CULTURAMA

The Culturama hall consists of a huge 180-degree panoramic interactive computer screen with a diameter of 10 meters that is made up of nine separate flat screens arranged in a semicircle and nine video projectors controlled by a single computer. Culturama has enabled the display of information that could never have been displayed clearly using a regular computer display system.

It was developed by the Egyptian Center for Documentation of Cultural, and Natural Heritage (CULTNAT) and holds its patent in 2007.

It displayed three periods from the history of Egypt:
 Ancient Egyptian Period
 Highlights of Islamic Civilization
 Modern Egypt

VISTA
Virtual Immersive Science and Technology Applications. It uses CAVE Technology.
VISTA features several projects, including:
 BA Model: A complete virtual recreation of the BA, including the Library's main building, planetarium, study rooms, and even the Library's furniture will be seen clearly and accurately in this demo.
 Sphinx
 Socio-Economic Data Visualization: A new visualization technique for multi-dimensional numerical data. The case study uses data provided by the UN, including health care, life duration expectancy and literacy rate over 25 years in some countries.

Digital Assets Repository 

The Digital Assets Repository (DAR) is a system developed at the Bibliotheca Alexandrina (BA) by the International School of Information Science (ISIS) to create and maintain digital library collections and preserve them to future generations, as well as providing free public access to the library's digitized collections through a web-based search and browsing facilities via DAR's website.

Management
Per Presidential Decree No. 76 in 2001, the Bibliotheca Alexandria is managed by a Council of Patrons, a Board of Trustees, and a Director. The founding director was Ismail Serageldin, who served until May 2017. He also was chair of the Board of Directors for each BA's affiliated research institutes and museums. He was succeeded by current manager Dr. Moustafa El Feqy. The Council of Patrons is composed of a number of world leaders from different parts of the world, numbering not less than eight and no more than twenty-four, to be selected by invitation of the President of Egypt, and one of these shall be the Director-General of UNESCO. The Board of Trustees shall be composed of a number of eminent figures of scientific and intellectual standing or international experience, Egyptians and non-Egyptians. They shall number no less than fifteen and no more than thirty; of whom five shall be ex-officio members of the Egyptian Government, namely: the Minister of Higher Education and Scientific Research, the Minister of Culture, the Minister of Foreign Affairs, the Governor of Alexandria and the President of the University of Alexandria.

Post-revolutionary involvement
The Bibliotheca Alexandrina held a variety of symposiums in 2011 in support of the Egyptian community and emphasizing the 2011 Egyptian Revolution, the Egyptian Constitution and Democratic Government in Arab nations. The library also displays a photo gallery of the January 25, 2011 revolution and works to document it in various formats.

Criticism
Criticism of the library comes chiefly from two angles. Many allege that the library is a white elephant, unsustainable for modern Egypt, which serves little more than a vanity project for the Egyptian government. Furthermore, there are fears that censorship would affect the library's collection. In addition, the building's elaborate architecture (which imitates a rising Sun) upset some who believed too much money was being spent on construction rather than the library's actual collection. Due to the lack of available funds, the library had only 500,000 books in 2002, a small number compared to other national libraries (however, in 2010, the library received an additional 500,000 books from the Bibliothèque nationale de France.) It has been estimated that it will take 80 years to fill the library at the current level of funding. The library relies heavily on donations to buy books for its collections.

Gallery

See also
Bibliotheca Alexandrina’s 100 Greatest Egyptian Films
 Planetarium Science Center

References

Further reading

Ali, Amro (16 October 2012) "Power, Rebirth and Scandal: A Decade of the Bibliotheca Alexandrina". Jadaliyya.

External links

 
 https://www.facebook.com/bibalexOfficial
 https://twitter.com/bibalexOfficial
 https://www.instagram.com/bibalexofficial/
 https://www.youtube.com/user/BAchannel
 Bibliotheca Alexandrina Webcast
 Bibliotheca Alexandrina webarchive
 Wikimania 2008 venue description
About Bibliotheca Alexandrina

 
Library buildings completed in 2002
World Digital Library partners
Scientific revolution
Ancient Alexandria in art and culture
21st-century architecture in Egypt
Culture in Alexandria
Education in Alexandria
Modernist architecture
Expressionist architecture
Libraries in Egypt
Cultural centers
Museums in Egypt
Buildings and structures in Alexandria
Tourist attractions in Alexandria
2002 establishments in Egypt
Rebuilt buildings and structures
Libraries established in 2002
Organisations based in Alexandria
Government agencies of Egypt